The BusinessMirror is a daily business newspaper in the Philippines founded in 2005 by Antonio Cabangon Chua, who was also its publisher and the owner of radio network Aliw Broadcasting Corporation.

As of September 2011, BusinessMirror has a daily circulation of 82,000.

ABS-CBN agreement
On April 30, 2014, BusinessMirror and ABS-CBN Integrated News and Current Affairs (consisting of ABS-CBN News Channel and its online affiliate, ABS-CBNnews.com) signed a content sharing/partnership agreement that will boost both entities to continue to deliver the credible business and economy news in the country. 

Officers of BusinessMirror and ABS-CBN News, including its news chief, Regina Reyes, witnessed the agreement signing.

References

External links

Finance – Today's News
Media Ownership Monitor Philippines - Print by VERA Files and Reporters Without Borders

Business newspapers
National newspapers published in the Philippines
Newspapers published in Metro Manila
Companies based in Makati
Daily newspapers published in the Philippines